Gonatocerus io is a species of fairyfly within the family Mymaridae. Its distribution is in Australia, where a female was caught in a forest in Capeville, Queensland.

References 

Insects described in 1915
Mymaridae
Insects of Queensland